Stephan Ladislaus Endlicher also known as Endlicher István László (24 June 1804, Bratislava (Pozsony) – 28 March 1849, Vienna) was an Austrian botanist, numismatist and Sinologist. He was a director of the Botanical Garden of Vienna.

Biography
Endlicher studied theology and received minor orders. In 1828 he was appointed to the Austrian National Library to reorganize its manuscript collection. Concurrently he studied natural history, in particular botany, and East-Asian languages.

In 1836, Endlicher was appointed keeper of the court cabinet of natural history, and in 1840 he became professor at the University of Vienna and director of its Botanical Garden. He wrote a comprehensive description of the plant kingdom according to a natural system, at the time its most comprehensive description. As proposed by Endlicher, it contained images with text. It was published together with the reissue of Franz Unger's  Grundzüge der Botanik (Fundamentals of Botany).

Endlicher was fundamental in establishing the Imperial Academy of Science, but when contrary to his expectations the Baron Joseph Hammer von Purgstall was elected its president in his stead, he resigned. He presented his library and herbaria to the state, and passed several hours every week for 10 years in the society of the Emperor Ferdinand, but he received no other reward than the title of councillor.

In 1842, he was elected as a member of the American Philosophical Society.

As a known liberal, Endlicher was asked to act as mediator during the revolution of 1848, but eventually was forced to leave Vienna for a time. In 1848 he also became a member of the Frankfurt Parliament and the assembly at Kremsier (Kroměříž).

Works
Endlicher made valuable contributions to the science of old German and classic literature, and pointed out new sources of Hungarian history, publishing Fragmenta Theotisca Versionis antiquissimae Evangelii Matthaei (edited with Hoffmann von Fallersleben, 1834), an edition of two poems of Priscian (1828), and Anonymi Belæ Regis Notarii de Gestis Hungarorum Liber (1827). His linguistic publications comprise Analecta Grammatica (with Eichenfeld, 1836), and Anfangsgründe der chinesischen Grammatik (Foundations of Chinese grammar; 1845).

His Verzeichniss der japanesischen und chinesischen Münzen des kaiserlichen Münz- und Antikencabinets (Catalog of Japanese and Chinese coins in the imperial coin and antique collections; 1837) and Atlas von China nach der Aufnahme der Jesuitenmissionäre (Atlas of China after the arrival of the Jesuit missionaries; 1843) are finely executed, and deserve mention as specimens of his great liberality.

He wrote several works in conjunction with other scholars, and many of his minor writings are scattered among the periodicals of his time, especially in the Annalen des Wiener Museums.

Botany
The majority and the most valuable of his works are on botany. Foremost among them are his: Genera Plantarum (1831–1841), in which he lays down a new system of classification; Grundzüge einer neuen Theorie der Pflanzenerzeugung (Foundations of a new theory of plant breeding; 1838); and Die Medicinalpflanzen der österreichischen Pharmakopöe (Medicinal plants in the Austrian pharmacopoeia; 1842).

His other principal botanical works are: Ceratotheca (1822), Flora Posoniensis (1830), Diesingia (1832), Atacta Botanica (1833), Iconographia Generum Plantarum (1838), Enchiridion Botanikum (1841) and Synopsis Coniferarum (1847).

Endlicher established the botanical journal Annalen des Wiener Museums der Naturgeschichte (1835 and on). He began the work Flora Brasiliensis with Carl Friedrich Philipp von Martius. He also published early works on the flora of Australia, including the plants collected by Carl von Hugel and Ferdinand Bauer.

Endlicher described many new plant genera, including the genus Sequoia, and also its only extant species Sequoia sempervirens (California coast redwood). Although Endlicher never offered an explanation for the name, later writers speculated that he must have been inspired by the achievements of the American Cherokee Indian linguist Sequoyah. John Davis credited Endlicher with naming the new species of Sierra redwood Sequoyah gigantea in 1847, the present day Sequoiadendron giganteum (California giant redwood), to honor Sequoyah's invention of the Cherokee syllabary. Recent scholarship supports this hypothesis; Endlicher appears to have combined the Latin sequi (meaning to follow) with his admiration of Sequoyah and coined "Sequoia" because the number of seeds per cone in the newly classified genus fell in mathematical sequence with the other four genera in the suborder. .

The genus Endlicheria of the family Lauraceae was named in his honour.

Endlicher System 

Endlicher's system for plant classification is laid out as follows in his Genera Plantarum, with a hierarchy of Regio, Sectio, Cohors, Classis, Ordo, with further subdivisions (and finally Genus), using a sequential numbering system, as shown for some taxa;

Outline
 Thallophyta
 Protophyta
 Hysterophyta
 Cormophyta
 Acrobrya
 Amphibrya
 Acramphibrya

Conspectus
 Regio I. THALLOPHYTA
 Sectio I. Protophyta
 Classis I. Algae
 Ordo I. Diatomaceae
 I. Diatomeae
 a. Frustulieae (Gen. 1–12)
 b. Hydrolineae (Gen. 13–18)
 II. Dermidieae 
 a. Micrasterieae (Gen. 19–21)
 b. Echinelleae (Gen. 22–24)
 Ordo II. Nostochinae
 Ordo III. Confervaceae
 Ordo IV. Characeae
 Ordo V. Ulvaceae
 Ordo VI. Floridae
 Ordo VII. Fucaceae
 Classis II. Lichenes
 Sectio II. Hysterophyta
 Classis III. Fungi 
 Regio II. CORMOPHYTA
 Sectio III. Acrobrya
 Cohors I. Anophyta
 Classis IV. Hepitacea
 Classis V. Musci
 Cohors II. Protophyta
 Classis VI. Equiseta
 Classis VII. Filices
 Classis VIII. Hydropterides
 Classis IX. Selagines
 Classis X. Zamiae
 Cohors II. Hysterophyta
 Classis XI. Rhizanthaea
 Sectio IV. Amphibrya
 Classis 12. Glumaceae
 Classis 13. Enantioblastae
 Classis 14. Helobiae
 Classis 15. Coronariae
 Ordo 51. Juncaceae
 Ordo 52. Philydreae
 Ordo 53. Melanthaceae
 Ordo 54. Pontederaceae
 Ordo 55. Liliaceae
 Ordo 56. Smilaceae
 Ordo 57. Dioscoreae
 Ordo 58. Taccaceae
 Classis 16. Artorhizae
 Classis 17. Ensatae
 Classis 18. Gynandrae
 Classis 19. Scitamineae
 Classis 20. Fluviales
 Classis 21. Spadiciflorae
 Classis 22. Principes.
 Sectio IV. Acramphibrya
 Cohors I. Gymnosperma
 Classis 23. Coniferae
 Cohors II. Apetalae
Classis 24. Piperitae
Aquaticae
Juliflorae
Oleraceae
Thymeleae
 Classis 29. Serpentariae
 Cohors III. Gamopetala
Plumbagines
 Classis 32. Campanulinae
Contortae
Tubiflorae
 Classis 31. Aggregatae
Caprifolia
Kuculiferae
Personatae
Petalantheae
 Classis 39. Bicornes
 Cohors IV. Dialypetala
 Classis 40. Discanthae
 Classis 41. Corniculatae
Polycarpicae
Rhoeades
Nelumbea
Parietales
Peponiferae
Opuntiae
Caryophyllinae
 Classis 49. Columniferae
Guttiferae
Hesperides
Acera
 Classis 54. Polygalinae
Frangulaceae
Tricoccae
Terebinthinae
Gruinales
 Classis 59. Calycifiorae
Myrtiflorae
Rosiflorae
 Classis 62. Leguminosae

Taxonomy

Standard author abbreviation

Important works 
 Flora Brasiliensis
 Genera Plantarum Secundum Ordines Naturales Disposita (1836–50)
 Synopsis Coniferarum (1847)
 Die Medicinal-Pflanzen der österreichischen Pharmakopöe: ein Handbuch für Ärzte und Apotheker. Gerold, Wien 1842
 Enumeratio plantarum quas in Novae Hollandiae ora austro-occidentali ad fluvium Cygnorum et in sinu Regis Georgii collegit Carolus Liber Baro de Hügel
 Prodromus Florae Norfolkicae  (Flora of Norfolk Island), available online at Project Gutenberg ebooks
 Stirplum Australisicum

Tribute
The African fish Polypterus endlicheri Heckel, 1847 was named in honor of Endlicher, who apparently discovered the species in the fish collection at the Naturhistorisches Museum (Vienna).

See also
:Category:Taxa named by Stephan Endlicher

References

External links

View digitized titles by Endlicher in Botanicus.org
Comprehensive bibliography on WorldCat

19th-century Austrian botanists
Austrian mycologists
1804 births
1849 deaths
Bryologists
Pteridologists
Phycologists
Paleobotanists
Botanists with author abbreviations
Austrian numismatists
Austrian orientalists
Austrian sinologists
Austrian people of Hungarian descent
19th-century Hungarian botanists
Hungarian mycologists
Hungarian orientalists
Scientists from Bratislava
Members of the Frankfurt Parliament
Recipients of the Pour le Mérite (civil class)
Austrian Roman Catholics
19th-century Austrian politicians